The 2021 National Pro Fastpitch season was to be the 17th season of professional softball under the name National Pro Fastpitch (NPF) for the only professional women's softball league in the United States. 

It was supposed to be the return of the league following the cancellation of the 2020 National Pro Fastpitch season due to the COVID-19 pandemic. However, due to the continuation of the pandemic, combined with the unavailability of home venues for the league’s member teams, continued COVID-19 protocols and quarantine requirements imposed on international teams who also field teams in the league, as well as the 2020 Summer Olympics, which would already shorten the season further, the decision was made to cancel the 2021 season as well.

Planned teams

References

External links 
 

Softball teams
Softball in the United States
National Pro Fastpitch season
National Pro Fastpitch season
National Pro Fastpitch, 2021